The retroflex clicks are a family of click consonants known only from the Central !Kung dialects of Namibia. They are sub-apical retroflex and should not be confused with the more widespread postalveolar clicks, which are sometimes mistakenly called "retroflex" (for example in Unicode) due to their concave tongue shape. 

There is no official symbol in the International Phonetic Alphabet that represents the forward articulation of these sounds, and the expected symbol  is rarely seen, though its addition to Unicode was supported by the IPA. In the literature they are typically written with the ad hoc digraph , the convention since Doke identified them as retroflex in 1926. (Doke's proposed symbol, did not catch on, nor did Vedder's and Anders' . For a while Amanda Miller, who noted a lateral fricated release (as had Vedder), transcribed them .)

However, Damin presumably had the articulations of Lardil, in which the "retroflex" consonants are apical alveolar rather than true retroflex, so it is likely that the Damin distinction, if it existed, might be described as post-alveolar  vs a more fronted .

Basic retroflex clicks are:

Features
Features of postalveolar clicks:

The place of articulation is post-alveolar, and the tongue shape may be subapical, which means it is articulated with the tip of the tongue curled up. The center of the tongue moves downward to create suction.

Occurrence
As with other click articulations, retroflex clicks may be produced with various manners. An example is the voiced retroflex click in the Grootfontein !Kung (Central Juu) word for 'water',  (g‼ú). 

Damin is the only other language known to have had such a sound, though only the nasal click occurred.

A retroflex series claimed for Ekoka !Kung turns out to be domed palatal clicks.

See also
The fricated palatal click of Ekoka !Kung, which was once thought to be retroflex

Notes and references

Further reading

Retroflex consonants
Click consonants